The murder of Samuel Paty, a French secondary school teacher, took place on 16 October 2020 in Éragny-sur-Oise, a suburb of Paris. Paty was killed and beheaded by an Islamic terrorist.

The perpetrator, Abdoullakh Abouyezidovich Anzorov, an 18-year-old Russian Muslim refugee, killed and beheaded Paty with a cleaver, and was shot and killed by the police minutes later. A social media campaign against Paty was linked to his subsequent murder.  One of Paty's students had alleged that in a class on freedom of expression, he had shown his students Charlie Hebdo's 2012 cartoons depicting the Islamic prophet Muhammad, despite the fact that she was absent from the class that day. She alleged that one of the cartoons portrayed an image of Muhammad naked with his genitals exposed. Since then, ten people have been charged with conspiring with and assisting the killer, including an imam, a parent of a student, and two students at Paty's school.

French president Emmanuel Macron said that the incident was "a typical Islamist terrorist attack", and that "our compatriot was killed for teaching children freedom of speech". The murder was one of several attacks in France in recent years and the second terrorist attack in France during the 2020 trial, at which alleged accomplices to the January 2015 Île-de-France attacks were to be arraigned for terrorism targeting the cartoons' publishers. The Paty incident sparked debate in French society and politics. Many Muslims expressed offence at the cartoons, which were also the subject of the previous Charlie Hebdo shooting. The president of the French Council of the Muslim Faith condemned the murder, as did imams of several mosques. Several Muslim-majority countries, including Turkey, Iran, Jordan and Kuwait and leaders as well as the Organisation of Islamic Cooperation denounced the attack and condemned the publication of the cartoons.

The response of the French government to the murder was criticized by many Muslims, including Turkish president Recep Tayyip Erdoğan; some of whom called for a boycott of French goods.

Background

Victim 
Samuel Paty was born on 18 September 1973 in Moulins, Allier. He attended Théodore de Banville High School, Lumière University Lyon 2 and the IUFM, Lyon. He lived ten minutes away from the middle school, in the small town of Éragny, Val-d'Oise. He was married and had a five-year-old son.

Perpetrator 
The perpetrator, Abdoullakh Abouyezidovich Anzorov, was an 18-year-old Russian immigrant of Chechen ethnic descent, born in Moscow, Russia. Chechnya is a Muslim-majority republic and federal subject of the Russian Federation.

Anzorov moved to France with refugee status 12 years earlier as a six-year-old boy. He lived in the La Madeleine district of the Normandy town of Évreux, about 100 km (62 miles) from the murder scene, and had no apparent connection with the teacher or the school.

The Anzorov family moved from the village of Shalazhi in Chechnya. Abdoullakh's father Abuezid moved first to Moscow, and then to Paris. Anzorov's half-sister joined ISIS in Syria in 2014. In March 2020, the family had received refugee status and 10-year residency cards in France. Abdoullakh was not noticed by security agencies, though he had previously been in court on minor misdemeanour charges.

Before the attack, he was in communication with two unidentified jihadists in Syria, one a Russian speaker, located through their IP addresses at Idlib, Syria, the last rebel stronghold of the country, under the control of the Hay'at Tahrir al-Sham organization, which denied responsibility for the attack. Immediately following the attack, he claimed responsibility in an audio message in Russian, in which he announced his readiness to be a "shahid" (martyr) and that, by killing Paty, who had "shown Allah in an insulting manner" he had "avenged the prophet". In a video broadcast on Instagram, among others, he referred to the Islamic State. He said: "Brothers, pray that Allah accepts me as a martyr".

Anzorov's family said they did not understand his actions. His father, a night worker, "seems to have lost control of his teenager." Anzorov had recently displayed signs of radicalization. He had posted on 30 August on his Twitter account, created on 8 June, "a photomontage depicting the beheading of a man". His Twitter account had been reported to the platform  without being tagged for further scrutiny. On 13 September 2020, he made a Twitter thread denouncing "the infidelity of the Saudi state, of its leaders, as well as all those who support them", a belief which he based on "its participation in the founding of idols worshiped [sic] outside of Allah", referring to the UN, UNESCO, WTO, Gulf Cooperation Council and the Arab League. Investigators are uncertain as to whether his requests were made to enable him to access sensitive sites.

Anzorov's body was repatriated from France in December 2020; he was buried in his hometown in the Urus-Martanovsky District in Chechnya. The funeral was attended by about 200 people, some of whom shouted "Allahu Akbar."

Events leading up to the murder 

Paty taught a moral and civic education course in early October 2020 on freedom of expression, in accord with the French national curriculum. He showed some of his teenage students a caricature of Muhammad from the satirical magazine Charlie Hebdo during a class discussion about freedom of speech. Before showing the caricature, Paty had invited Muslim students to leave the classroom if they wished. According to one student, he had previously shown these cartoons as part of the discussion every year since the Charlie Hebdo shooting in 2015. In the largest Sunni sects of Islam, any depiction of Muhammad is considered blasphemous.

According to some sources, Paty showed two cartoons to his students, one of which portrayed Muhammad naked with his genitals exposed, although accounts differ on precisely what was presented in the classroom.

Brahim Chnina, a female student's father, accused Paty of disseminating pornography to students and filed a criminal complaint with the police. Paty responded by filing a complaint of defamation. Chnina claimed on YouTube and Facebook that Paty had displayed an image of Muhammad nude; he named Paty, and gave the school's address. He encouraged other parents to join him in action and mobilise against the teacher, whom he described as a thug.

The Grande Mosque de Pantin published a video on its Facebook page a week before the murder. Sefrioui called the teacher a "thug" in a video (French: voyou), while denouncing the administration of the college. He demanded the teacher's exclusion from high school with the rectorate. The term "thug" had been repeatedly used by the parent Brahim Chnina earlier. The videos were taken down in the hours after the murder.

Chnina also filed a complaint with the school, and encouraged people to protest at the school. A meeting was held between the head teacher, the teacher, and an official from the education authority. Chnina additionally filed a legal complaint about Paty's lesson, leading the teacher to go to the local police station accompanied by the principal. Paty told investigators he could not understand the complaint because Chnina's daughter was not in class on the day Paty showed the cartoon.
In March 2021, Chnina's daughter, known as "Z", admitted she had been suspended from school due to truancy since the day prior to Paty showing the cartoons, and, as such, she had not been in the classroom that day. Instead, she made up the cartoon story to appease her father.  According to the Paty family lawyers, however, Brahim Chnina was aware that his daughter had been expelled before the cartoon incident.

Murder 

On 16 October 2020, a week and a half after Paty's freedom-of-speech class, Anzorov, having been driven to Paty's school by an alleged accomplice, waited outside the gates and asked a number of students to point out the teacher. He paid two students, aged 14 and 15, around €300 to identify Paty; the two then waited with Anzorov for two hours until they sighted Paty leaving. A Friday, it was the last schoolday before a two-week holiday. Anzorov had told them he intended to "hit" and "humiliate" Paty; according to France's chief terrorism prosecutor, Jean-François Ricard, in order to "make him apologise for the cartoon of the Prophet Muhammad".

Anzorov then followed Paty as he left the school. In addition to decapitating Paty, Anzorov inflicted a number of wounds to his head, abdomen, and upper limbs. Witnesses told police they heard the killer shout "Allahu Akbar" (the Takbir) during the attack.

Minutes after the murder, an account named @Tchetchene_270, identified by prosecutor Jean-François Ricard as belonging to Abdoullakh Anzorov, posted on Twitter an image of Paty's severed head. The photo was accompanied by the message: "In the name of Allah, the most gracious, the most merciful, ... to Macron, leader of the infidels, I executed one of your hellhounds who dared to belittle Muhammad, calm his fellow human beings before a harsh punishment is inflicted on you." The image was seen by many of Paty's students.

Anzorov shot at the police with an air rifle and tried to stab them with a knife. In response, the police shot him nine times, killing him. On Anzorov's phone, they found a text claiming responsibility and a photograph of Paty's body.

French government response 

President Macron visited the school where Paty had worked, and said that the incident was "a typical Islamist terrorist attack". He also said: "our compatriot was killed for teaching children freedom of speech". French Education Minister Jean-Michel Blanquer called the killing an "attack on the French nation as a whole". Jean-Rémi Girard, president of the secondary school teaching union, said teachers were "devastated" but would not be cowed. France's anti-terrorist prosecutor said the teacher had been "assassinated for teaching," and the attack was an assault on the principle of freedom of expression.

Sixteen people were later taken into custody for investigation. They included Anzorov's grandparents, parents, and 17-year-old brother. Also arrested were Sefrioui, Brahim Chnina, the father of a girl in Paty's class, who is suspected of issuing a fatwa against Paty, and four students who are suspected of taking money from the killer in exchange for identifying the teacher.

French police announced that there were more than 80 messages on social media from French people supporting the attacker. The French Minister of the Interior, Gérald Darmanin, ordered that the Grande Mosque de Pantin was to be closed for six months. The mosque, which has about 1,500 worshippers situated just north of Paris, was ordered closed for having published videos inciting violence against Samuel Paty. Its imam, Sefrioui, is under investigation and remains under arrest. The mosque removed the posts after the murder and expressed "regret" over publishing the videos, and published instead an announcement condemning the "savagery" of the teacher's killing.

Two days after the murder, a defence council ordered the deportation of 231 foreign citizens which were known to security services in the Fiche S register. Of those, 180 were in prison and the rest were to be arrested. The interior minister Gérald Darmanin demanded dissolution of two Islamic NGOs: Collective Against Islamophobia in France (CCIF) and Barakacity, which he described as "enemies" of the state. Both NGOs have been accused of taking part in a social media campaign against the teacher, launched by the father of one of his pupils. The CCIF denied participating in such a harassment campaign. According to the prosecutor Jean-François Ricard, speaking on 21 October, there was a "direct causal link" between the hate campaign and Anzorov's murder of Paty.

On 21 October a national memorial for Paty, prepared in consultation with his family, was held at the Sorbonne. President Macron awarded the  posthumously to Paty. Texts read at the ceremony included Jean Jaurès's Lettre aux instituteurs et institutrices. In an address of around 15 minutes, Macron described Paty as "a quiet hero" and stated that "we will not give up cartoons". Macron also announced that the "Sheikh Yassin Collective" founded by Sefrioui to support Hamas would be dissolved, as having been "directly implicated" in the murder. The government was reported to be preparing to dissolve a further fifty organizations connected with radical Islam.

On 23 October, the Bibliothèque nationale de France published an introduction to Jaurès's letter, linking to a digitized version of its entire content. La Dépêche, the newspaper in which the letter had originally been published in 1888, republished the text a few days later. Meanwhile, minister Blanquer had selected the letter to be read in schools when pupils would return there after a two-week holiday (Paty had been murdered at the start of that holiday shortly after lessons had finished). The fact that only bowdlerized versions of Jaurès's letter had been distributed to the schools was criticised, for example in an article published in Libération, which prompted the minister to make the entire letter available, just in time for the commemorations for Paty which were held in schools all over France at 11:00 on Monday 2 November. That Monday was the first schoolday since the attack and the Prime Minister of France, Jean Castex, attended the commemoration at Paty's school, the Collège Bois-d'Aulne, which itself did not open to its pupils until the following day. During the commemorative ceremony on 2 November across France, more than 400 incidents of threats and interruptions were recorded; several youths were arrested.

Prosecutions 
By 22 October seven people had been charged, of which five were in police custody (the two schoolchildren were legal minors). Three of Anzorov's friends were charged with abetting in the crime: two accused of "complicity in a terrorist murder" and another of "terrorist association". One of the pair accused of complicity was alleged to have assisted Anzorov in acquiring a weapon, while the other drove him to the scene of the crime. A 48-year-old parent of a student at Paty's school, named as "Brahim C", was accused of communicating by text message with Anzorov and of organising the campaign of hate against Paty; he had made videos insulting the teacher and demanding his suspension. The imam Abdelhakim Sefrioui, who also appeared in videos castigating Paty, was himself in custody, and Gérald Darmanin told radio station Europe 1 that Brahim C and Sefrioui had issued a fatwa condemning Paty.

By 6 November, ten people were being prosecuted, including another 18-year-old of Chechen origin, a French 18-year-old, and a 17-year-old girl, all charged with "criminal terrorist conspiracy" having been arrested in eastern France, far from either Paris or Évreux.

In Pontoise, an Algerian man was convicted of glorifying terrorism and sentenced to six months in custody for calling the murderer a martyr; he was to be deported at the end of the sentence and banned from France for a decade. Three people between the ages of 15 and 17 were arrested and charged on Friday, 6 November with "supporting terrorism", having made threats during the national commemorations of Paty's life that Monday. Further prosecutions were planned in around a dozen of the more serious incidents of over 400 interruptions of the commemoration that took place on the same day according to the education minister Jean-Michel Blanquer.

The schoolgirl has been charged with slander. Her father, Brahim Chnina is under investigation for complicity of the murder.

Law against Islamist extremism 
After the murder of Paty, a bill was put forward to fight Islamist extremism and separatism to fight the roots of jihadist violence. It was approved by the National Assembly in February 2021.

A new bill was introduced, which makes it unlawful to threaten a public servant in order to gain an exception or special treatment which carries a penalty of up to five years in prison. The legislation expands the powers of authorities to close places of worship and religious organisations when they promote "hate or violence". The law requires religious funds from abroad exceeding €10,000 to be declared and the relevant accounts to be certified, so as to regulate the donations from countries such as Turkey, Qatar and Saudi Arabia. Millions of euros in funding had previously reached France from countries such as Turkey, Morocco and Saudi Arabia.

It provides stricter rules for allowing home-schooling in order to prevent parents taking children out of school in order to let them pursue their education in underground Islamist institutions. Doctors performing virginity tests would be subject to fines or prison sentences. These changes were prompted by a number of cases of Muslim men trying to have their marriages annulled by accusing their spouse of having had sex before marriage. Authorities will have to refuse residency documents to applicants who practise polygamy. Forced marriages, thought to affect around 200,000 women in France, were likewise to be combated with greater scrutiny from registrars.

Other reactions 

The name alludes to the hashtag #JeSuisCharlie, launched as a token of solidarity in the aftermath of the 2015 Islamist attack on the satirical magazine Charlie Hebdo, which had published cartoons depicting Muhammad. Charlie Hebdo issued a statement expressing its "horror and revolt" and extending its support to the family and friends of Paty. Charlie Hebdo caricatures were displayed on regional authority buildings in Toulouse and Montpellier. Rallies in protest against the murder, and criticising the government's ineffective response to radical Islam, took place in Place de la République in Paris, and in other cities across France. The demonstrators held various placards with statements such as "Je suis Samuel" and "Schools in mourning" written on them. The demonstrators also chanted "Freedom of expression, freedom to teach", or sang "La Marseillaise," the French national anthem. Politicians, academics, and envoys joined the demonstrations across France. In Lyon around 12,000 joined the demonstrations, in Toulouse approximately 5,000 turned out, and hundreds more assembled in Nice.

The French Council of the Muslim Faith (CFCM), the main interlocutor of the public authorities on Islam, condemned the assassination and on Thursday, 22 October provided the Imams of France with a text that they could use as inspiration for their Friday prayers in response to the attack. In it, CFCM noted that "The horrible assassination ... reminds us of the scourges that sadly mark our reality: that of the eruption in our country of radicalism, violence and terrorism claiming to be Islam, claiming victims of all ages, all conditions and all convictions." "No, we Muslims are not persecuted in France," the authors continued. "We are sometimes targets of anti-Muslim acts, but others are also victims of hostile acts. In the face of these provocations, we must remain decent, serene and clear-sighted." On 1 November, the CFCM organized a meeting to discuss the training of religious executives and a plan to fight radicalization. Various avenues are studied, in particular "carrying out theological work on the misguided concepts of the Muslim religion" and "carrying out collegial work on the Friday sermon in order to disseminate a strong word from religious executives carried by imams". Other Muslims in France accused the government of a "heavy-handed clampdown" on their communities in the aftermath of the murder.

Many Muslims and religious leaders in France condemned the act. In a tweet, Chems-Eddine Hafiz, rector of the Grand Mosque of Paris, called on the imams of his federation to dedicate their preaching the following Friday to the memory of Samuel Paty and to the fight against Islamist terrorism. According to Europe 1, "almost everywhere in France", imams respond to the rector's call, paying homage to the murdered history teacher. In a press release, the Rhône Mosques Council condemned "blind hatred" and "murderous madness" and affirms that the religion of which the terrorist "proclaims himself does not recognize itself in him". The signatories of the press release, who come from around thirty mosques, declare that they are committed "to strengthening the study of the ideological foundations of extremist thought and the fight against those who feed it, feed it and finance it". The website  published a joint statement of 30 imams calling on "Muslim youth to go to qualified imams and theologians, in their spiritual quest, so as not to fall into obscurantism".

The attack on Paty polarised French people and politicians alike and led to a public debate on how Islam should be integrated or assimilated into French secular society. One theme of the debate concerned the education of imams which in part come from abroad. The terrorist attack also highlighted the problems France faced with integrating foreigners into the French society in a country which was becoming increasingly racially and ethnically diverse and the political establishment formed a consensus that two or three generations of "newcomers" had struggled to integrate. An opinion poll carried out by Institut français d'opinion publique (Ifop) found that 87% of the respondents considered the secularist society in France was under threat and 79% agreed that Islamism had declared war on France and the French Republic. The poll found that 89% of the respondents thought the threat of terrorism was high, 38% of which said it was very high. This was a significant increase when compared with the data of the previous month, though the statistic had exceeded the 50% mark during the spate of Islamist attacks in France during 2015.

Turkey; Erdoğan–Macron dispute 

The position taken by Macron was condemned in the Grand National Assembly of Turkey by the dominant AK Party, the Nationalist Movement Party, the secular opposition Republican People's Party and the Good Party, though the opposition Peoples' Democratic Party did not sign the joint declaration condemning Macron's words.

Following actions and statements of French President Macron such as describing Islam as a religion "in crisis" worldwide, Turkish President Recep Tayyip Erdoğan questioned Macron's mental health and called for a boycott of French goods. Erdoğan claimed Muslims in France were "subjected to a lynch campaign similar to that against Jews in Europe before World War II", and that "European leaders should tell the French president to stop his hate campaign". Erdoğan also attacked Macron personally, saying "Macron needs treatment on a mental level" and asked: "What's the problem of the individual called Macron with Islam and with the Muslims?"  He continued: "What else can be said to a head of state who does not understand freedom of belief and who behaves in this way to millions of people living in his country who are members of a different faith?"

In response to Erdoğan's remarks, France recalled its ambassador to Turkey, and a presidential spokesperson said: "President Erdogan's comments are unacceptable. Excess and rudeness are not a method. We demand that Erdogan change the course of his policy because it is dangerous in every respect." In support of Macron, German government spokesman Steffen Seibert said of Erdoğan's behaviour: "They are defamatory comments that are completely unacceptable, particularly against the backdrop of the horrific murder of the French teacher Samuel Paty by an Islamist fanatic", while the Minister for Foreign Affairs, Heiko Maas, said Erdoğan's insulting language was "a particular low point". The Prime Minister of Italy, Giuseppe Conte, wrote that "personal insults do not help the positive agenda that the EU wants to pursue with Turkey", and the Prime Minister of the Netherlands, Mark Rutte, said his country "stands firmly with France and for the collective values of the European Union". The President of the European Commission, Ursula von der Leyen, was also supportive of Macron's position.

Responding to Erdoğan's insults, Macron published on Twitter a message in English, French, and Arabic, saying: "Our history is one of a battle against tyranny and fanaticisms. We will continue, … we respect all differences in a spirit of peace. We will never accept hate speech and we defend reasonable debate. We will continue. We hold ourselves always on the side of human dignity and universal values".

Charlie Hebdo, responding to Erdoğan's position, published a cartoon mocking the Turkish president on its front page on 27 October. Fahrettin Altun, Erdoğan's press secretary, said on Twitter that "We condemn this most disgusting effort by this publication to spread its cultural racism and hatred".

Other countries
After President Macron defended the publication of cartoons in a tribute to Paty, there were calls in some Muslim countries to boycott French products. Egyptian President Abdel Fattah el-Sisi, the Malaysian government, and the Foreign Ministry of Morocco said that freedom of expression does not apply to insulting Islam or Muslims, and Prime Minister of Pakistan Imran Khan said that Macron was promoting Islamophobia. Some French goods were removed from shops in Jordan, Kuwait, and Qatar, and hundreds of travel agencies in Kuwait suspended booking flights to France. Protests were also held in Bangladesh, Iraq, and Libya against Macron and his defense of the caricatures.

The Egyptian Foreign Ministry, the Indian Ministry of External Affairs, the Saudi Arabia Foreign Ministry, and the Turkish Ministry of Foreign Affairs condemned the murder, with the Indian ministry also condemning personal attacks against Macron.
 India: The Ministry of External Affairs of India, condemned the murder with the Indian ministry also condemning personal attacks against President Macron.

 Canada: Prime Minister of Canada Justin Trudeau said that freedom of expression has limits, citing the example of shouting fire in a crowded theater. Trudeau's remarks were criticized in Canada and in France. Trudeau subsequently clarified his position to reaffirm the importance of defending freedom of expression.

 Iran: The French delegation was summoned to protest France's permission of "hatred against Islam under the guise of support for freedom of expression". Clerics at the Shia holy city of Qom denounced Macron and the Charlie Hebdo cartoons, calling for economic sanctions against France from Iran and the wider Islamic world.

 Qatar: A week of French cultural events at Qatar University was postponed on account of what described as "deliberate attack on Islam and its symbols".

 Russia: Ramzan Kadyrov, Head of the Chechen Republic, one of the federal subjects of Russia, criticized Macron's position on free speech. He wrote: "You are forcing people into terrorism, pushing people towards it, not leaving them any choice, creating the conditions for the growth of extremism in young people's heads. You can boldly call yourself the leader and inspiration of terrorism in your country". Kadyrov, once a rebel in the First Chechen War, had recently supported Russia in the military suppression of the Islamist insurgency in the North Caucasus and sought to minimize the significance of the killer's place of birth by pointing to his upbringing in France. He wrote on Instagram that showing cartoons of Muhammad was not to be labelled free speech.

International organisations 
  European Union Leaders of the 27 member states of the European Union released a joint statement condemning the attack on Samuel Paty and the 2020 Nice stabbing encouraging dialogue and understanding between societies and religions. They called the attacks an assault on their values.

 Muslim World League  Sheikh Muhammad bin Abdul Karim Issa, Secretary General of the Muslim World League, said "acts of violence and terrorism [were] crimes in all religions," suggesting further that such situations might be avoided by "refrain[ing] from stirring hatred by insulting religion." He made an appeal against the unnecessary incitement of violence through the circulation of incendiary literature.

  Organisation of Islamic Cooperation  The Organisation of Islamic Cooperation said that although it denounced "all acts of terror in the name of religion", it would continue to oppose the "continued publication" of "blasphemous cartoons". It added that it was the "suggestions of certain French leaders … that risk submerging French–Muslim relations".

 United Nations Alliance of Civilizations  In a press statement released on 17 October 2020, Miguel Ángel Moratinos, High Representative of the United Nations Alliance of Civilizations (UNAOC), strongly condemned the decapitation of the French school teacher in Conflans-Sainte-Honorine on the previous day. He reiterates being committed to stand against divisive policies and extremist ideologies and offers condolences to the family of the victim and to the Government and people of France.

Media coverage 
According to researcher Liam Duffy, anglophone media reporting in Britain and the United States received criticism in France for misrepresenting the attack and presenting France as the villain. Of the two most influential newspapers, The New York Times and The Washington Post, neither used the term jihadism in their reports according to expert . In other American reporting, information on the problems caused by Islamic extremism was largely absent while there were numerous warnings of rising nationalism and a French "crackdown on Islam". The criticism did not encompass The Financial Times, which instead was praised for having interviewed teachers in France.

See also 
 2020 Nice stabbing
 Internet censorship in France
 Islam and blasphemy
 Islam and violence
 Jyllands-Posten Muhammad cartoons controversy
 The Satanic Verses controversy
 List of Islamist terrorist attacks
 Square Samuel-Paty in Paris.

References

External links 

2020 murders in France
2020s in Île-de-France
Conflans-Sainte-Honorine
Deaths by person in France
History of Yvelines
Islamic terrorism in France
Islamic terrorist incidents in 2020
Islamism-related beheadings
Murder in Île-de-France
October 2020 crimes in Europe
October 2020 events in France
Stabbing attacks in 2020
Stabbing attacks in France
Terrorist incidents in France in 2020
Terrorist incidents in Île-de-France
Terrorist incidents involving knife attacks
Violence against men in Europe
2020s murders in Paris
Male murder victims